Albula koreana, the Korean bonefish, is a species of marine fish found in the western Pacific Ocean, off the coast of eastern Asia.

Taxonomy 
Bonefish were once believed to be a single species with a global distribution, however 9 different species have since been identified. There are three identified species in the Atlantic and six in the Pacific. A. koreana was described as a new species in 2011 based on genetic evidence from populations previously assigned to A. vulpes.

Distribution 
This species has been identified off the southern coast of South Korea and the northern coast of Taiwan.

References 

Albuliformes
Marine fauna of East Asia
Fish of Korea
Fish of Taiwan
Fish described in 2011